Marvin Leonard "Murph" Goldberger (October 22, 1922 – November 26, 2014) was an American theoretical physicist and former president of the California Institute of Technology.

Biography
Goldberger was born in Chicago, Illinois. He went on to receive his B.S. at the Carnegie Institute of Technology (now Carnegie Mellon University), and Ph.D. in physics from the University of Chicago in 1948. His advisor on thesis, Interaction of High-Energy Neutrons with Heavy Nuclei, was Enrico Fermi.

Goldberger was a postdoc at MIT at least by 1951 where he shared a communal physics office with at least Murray Gell-Mann where they worked together on various projects and he encouraged him to join him at Chicago 1952 onwards, before he became professor of physics at Princeton University from 1957 through 1977. He received the Dannie Heineman Prize for Mathematical Physics in 1961, and in 1963 was elected to the U.S. National Academy of Sciences. In 1965 he was elected a Fellow of the American Academy of Arts and Sciences. In 1980, he was elected to the American Philosophical Society. From 1978 through 1987 he served as president of Caltech. He was the Director of the Institute for Advanced Study from 1987 to 1991. From 1991 to 1993 he was a professor of physics at the University of California, Los Angeles. From 1993 until his death in November 2014, he served on the faculty of the University of California, San Diego, first as a professor of physics and then as a professor emeritus.  Goldberger also served as Dean of Natural Sciences for UC San Diego from 1994 to 1999.

In 1954, he and Murray Gell-Mann introduced crossing symmetry. In 1958, he and Sam Bard Treiman published the so-called Goldberger–Treiman relation.

He was a participant in 1958's Project 137 and a founding member and first chairman of JASON.  He was involved in nuclear arms control efforts.  He also advised a number of major corporations; for example he was on the board of directors of General Motors for 12 years.

Several of his doctoral students were elected Fellows of the American Physical Society: Allan N. Kaufman in 1962, Cyrus D. Cantrell in 1980, and Martin B. Einhorn in 1991. Goldberger died in 2014 in La Jolla, California. His wife Mildred Ginsburg Goldberger (1923–2006) was a mathematician and economist. Upon his death he was survived by two sons and three grandchildren.

Bibliography
  (In Relations de dispersion et particules élémentaires: École d'été de physique théorique, Les Houches, 1960)
  (corrected version of book originally published in 1964)

References

External links
 1983 Audio Interview with Marvin Goldberger by Martin Sherwin – Voices of the Manhattan Project
 Oral History interview transcript with Marvin L. Goldberger 12 February 1986, American Institute of Physics, Niels Bohr Library and Archives 

1922 births
2014 deaths
Directors of the Institute for Advanced Study
Presidents of the California Institute of Technology
American physicists
20th-century American Jews
Carnegie Mellon University alumni
Jewish scientists
Fellows of the American Association for the Advancement of Science
Members of the United States National Academy of Sciences
Members of JASON (advisory group)
University of Chicago alumni
21st-century American Jews
Members of the American Philosophical Society